Theta Indi (θ Ind) is a binary star in the constellation Indus. Its apparent magnitude is 4.40 and it is approximately 98.8 light years away based on parallax. The smaller companion, B, has a spectral type of G0V (yellow main-sequence) and an apparent magnitude of 7.18 at a separation of 6.71". Recent observations suggest the primary is itself a binary with components Aa and Ab orbiting at 0.0617", estimated period about 1.3 years.

References

Indus (constellation)
A-type main-sequence stars
Triple star systems
Indi, Theta
Durchmusterung objects
202730
105319
8140